= Samantha Schenini =

Swiss actress and model

Samantha Schenini Galvan
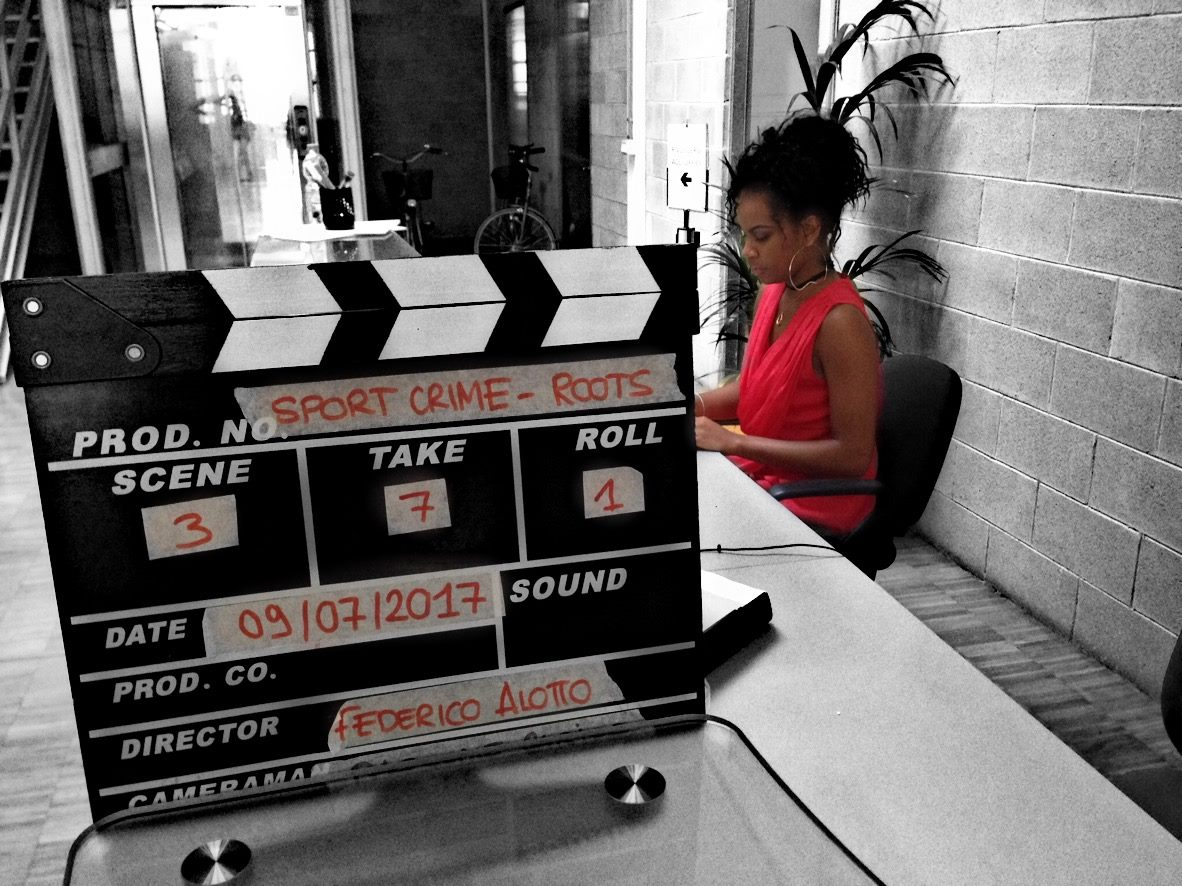
- Samantha Schenini on the set of "Sport Crime"
- Born: 19 September 1998 (age 26); Bellinzona, Switzerland
- Occupation(s): Model, actress

Samantha Schenini Galvan (born 19 September 1998 in Bellinzona) is a model and actress of swiss-dominican origins.

She participated and won in several beauty and talent contests.

She is known as "Jasmine", the secretary and co-star of the international Tv Series Sport Crime.
